('Walk the parish') or  ('Walk around') was a historical form of care for the poor in the history of Sweden to support the very poorest in the peasant community.

 was practiced in the Swedish countryside already in the Middle Ages to care for those of the community destitute who could not work. In 1296, it was mentioned in the Law of Uppland that a community pauper had the right to be given shelter in the households of the parish for 24 hours each. This method was a phenomenon of the countryside, as the city paupers were normally given shelter in the poor houses from at least circa 1300 onward. 
 
The households of a parish were traditionally divided into s: normally, one  of the village contained six households. Each  was given responsibility for one pauper each, who were then shifted between them according to a schedule. Normally, the pauper stayed in each household for one week at a time. They were expected to contribute with what they could in exchange for food, care and housing.

The people participating in the 'auction' did not actually buy the pauper; however, their 'bid' was the money they demanded from the parish poor care to house them and so those who offered to take care of the poor for the lowest amount won.

See also
 Welfare in Sweden

References

 Nordisk Familjebok, 1923

Social history of Sweden
Unfree labour by country
Labor in Sweden